List of endemic flora of Israel refers to flowers, plants and trees endemic to Israel. There are 2,867 known species of plants. 
Aegilops sharonensis
Allium papillare
Allium telavivense
Anacamptis israelitica
Anthemis brachycarpa
Anthemis leucanthemifolia
Aristida sieberiana
Atractylis carduus
Ballota philistaea
Bromus rigidus
Campanula sulphurea
Centaurea procurrens
Colchicum feinbruniae
Convolvulus secundus
Crepis aculeata
Crocus aleppicus
Cutandia philistaea
Echinops philistaeus
Erodium subintegrifolium
Erodium telavivense
Ferula samariae
Gagea dayana
Galium philistaeum
Iris atrofusca
Iris atropurpurea
Iris vartanii
Leopoldia bicolor
Leopoldia eburnea
Linaria joppensis
Lupinus palaestinus
Lycium schweinfurthii
Maresia pulchella
Onopordum telavivense
Paronychia palaestina
Phlomis brachyodon
Picris amalecitana
Plantago sarcop
Polygonum palaestinum
Pyrus syriaca
Rumex occultans
Rumex rothschildianus
Scandix blepharicarpa
Senecio joppensis
Silene modesta
Silene papillosa
Silene telavivensis
Tamarix aphylla
Tordylium aegyptiacum
Trifolium billardieri
Trifolium dichroanthum
Trifolium palaestinum
Trifolium philistaeum
Trisetaria koelerioides
Tulipa boissieri
Verbascum berytheum

See also
Jerusalem Botanical Gardens
List of native plants of Palestine (A-B)
Wildlife of Israel
Wild edible plants of Israel / Palestine

Biota of Israel
 
Endemic flora